The Sarnia Legionnaires are a junior ice hockey team based in Sarnia, Ontario, Canada. They play in the Western division of the Greater Ontario Junior Hockey League.

History

The Sarnia Bees joined the ranks of the current Western Junior "B" league in 1969.  The Bees were an upstart team in direct competition with the historic Sarnia Legionnaires of the Western Ontario Junior A Hockey League. By mid-season, the Bees had stolen away most of the Legionnaires fan base and the team was forced to fold.

Over the next quarter century the Bees had some good teams but the club seldom lived up to the legend of the Sarnia Legionnaires.

After dominating the Western Ontario Junior B Hockey League during the 1970-71 season, the Bees elected to jump to the Legionnaires' old league, the Southern Ontario Junior A Hockey League, but the adventure was not overly successful and the Bees returned to the WOJHL the next season.  Their experience in Junior A seemingly fueled the Bees during the 1972-73 season as they won the WOJHL championship and went on to defeat the Metro Junior B Hockey League's Toronto Nationals 4-games-to-2 to win Sarnia's first Sutherland Cup since the Sarnia Legionnaires did it in 1968.

In 1983, the Bees were again WOJBHL champions and pushed all the way to the Sutherland Cup finals. In the final, they met the Metro Junior B Hockey League's St. Michael's Buzzers. After a long battle, the Buzzers finished off the Bees in game 7 to deny the franchise of its second Sutherland Cup.

In 1995, it saw the arrival of an Ontario Hockey League known as the Sarnia Sting to the city. To stay out of the shadow of the OHL team, the Bees changed their name to the Steeplejacks.  After another couple name changes, the Sarnia franchise became the Sarnia Blast in 2001. The team is a long-standing member of the Western Junior "B" league (WOHL).

In 2002, the Blast won the WOHL championship and qualified for the Sutherland Cup final. In the final they met the Mid-Western Junior B Hockey League's Elmira Sugar Kings. The series went the distance, but the Blast prevailed in game 7 of the series and brought the Sutherland Cup back to Sarnia for the seventh time and the first time in 29 years.

In 2008, the ownership of the Sarnia Blast was transferred to a consortium of local individuals. In memory of the fabled Sarnia Legionnaires of old, the new owners and the local Royal Canadian Legion allowed for the current team to resurrect the name. The new owners said they will put pictures of the original Legionnaires in their dressing room, hoping that will inspire today's young players.

In their first year back under the Legionnaire name after a 38-year absence, the club finished first in the Western Conference of the Greater Ontario Hockey League. In the playoffs, they won the conference championship by eliminating the St. Thomas Stars 4-1 in games, taking out the Strathroy Rockets 4-3 in games and ousting the London Nationals 4-2 in games to win the Weir Cup.

Tyler Cicchini led the way, scoring 18 goals in 22 post season games. That was one more than the record of 17 playoff goals Don Gordon of the original Legionnaires set in the spring of 1968.

The team set a league record in the 2009 playoffs when it scored three goals in 14 seconds in a game against Strathroy.

Sarnia Jr. 'B' hockey teams named the Legionnaires have now won six Western Ontario championships in 17 years of action, along with four Sutherland Cups.

2022–23 hockey operations
General Manager - Paul Hurtubise
Assistant General Manager - Brian Irwin
Director of Hockey Operations - Bob Farlow
Head coach - Derek DiMuzio
Assistant coach - Darren Rogers
Assistant coach - Kevin Morgan
Assistant coach - Joe Ferrera
Assistant coach - Ben Schoch
Goalie Coach - Darryl Lennon
Goalie Coach - Steve Bryce
Trainer - Lee-Ann Ellis
Equipment Manager - Dave Anger
Equipment Manager - Chris Guthrie
Equipment Staff - Matt Churchill
Equipment Staff - Aidan Smith
Scout - Darren Ferguson

Season-by-season results

Playoffs
SOJHL Years
1972 DNQ

Sutherland Cup appearances
1973: Sarnia Bees defeated Toronto Nationals 4-games-to-2
1982: St. Michael's Buzzers defeated Sarnia Bees 4-games-to-3
2002: Sarnia Blast defeated Elmira Sugar Kings 4-games-to-3

Professional alumni
Frank Beaton
Jerry Butler
Dino Ciccarelli
Mike Crombeen
Mike Dark
Scott Garland
Matt Martin
Tony McKegney
Robbie Moore
Mike Murray
Rumun Ndur
Kraig Nienhuis

External links
Legionnaires Webpage
GOJHL Webpage

Western Junior B Hockey League teams
Sport in Sarnia